Dharmapur Assembly constituency (ধৰ্মপুৰ বিধান সভা সমষ্টি) is one of the 126 assembly constituencies of Assam Legislative Assembly. Dharmapur forms part of the Barpeta Lok Sabha constituency.

Dharmapur Assembly constituency Details

Following are details on Dharmapur Assembly constituency-

Country: India.
 State: Assam.
 District: Nalbari district .
 Lok Sabha Constituency: Barpeta Lok Sabha/Parliamentary constituency.
 Assembly Categorisation: Rural constituency.
 Literacy Level:79.89%.
 Eligible Electors as per 2021 General Elections: 1,41,592 Eligible Electors. Male Electors:73,559. Female Electors:68,033 .
 Geographic Co-Ordinates:   26°25'25.7"N 91°20'45.2"E.
 Total Area Covered:  236 square kilometres.
 Area Includes:Dharmapur, Khetri Dharmapur, Pakowa and Natun Dehar mouzas in Nalbari thana in Nalbari subdivision, of Nalbari district of Assam.
 Inter State Border :Nalbari.
 Number Of Polling Stations: Year 2011-184,Year 2016-184,Year 2021-61.

Members of Legislative Assembly 

Following is the list of past members representing Dharmapur Assembly constituencyin Assam Legislature-
 1967: K. Hazarika, Communist Party of India.
 1972: Surendra Nath Das, Indian National Congress.
 1978: Ramani Barman, Janata Party.
 1983: Bhumidhar Barman, Indian National Congress.
 1985: Chandra Mohan Patowary, Independent.
 1991: Chandra Mohan Patowary, Independent.
 1996: Chandra Mohan Patowary, Asom Gana Parishad.
 2001: Nilamani Sen Deka, Indian National Congress.
 2006: Chandra Mohan Patowary, Asom Gana Parishad.
 2011: Nilamani Sen Deka, Indian National Congress.
 2016: Chandra Mohan Patowary, Bharatiya Janata Party.
2021: Chandra Mohan Patowary, Bharatiya Janata Party.

Election results

2016 result

External links

See also
 Golaghat district
 Dergaon
 List of constituencies of Assam Legislative Assembly

References 

Assembly constituencies of Assam